George Bowden may refer to:

George E. Bowden (1852–1908), U.S. Representative from Virginia
George Bowden (Australian politician) (1888–1962), Australian soldier and politician
Harland Bowden (George Robert Harland Bowden, 1873–1927), British MP for North East Derbyshire, 1914–1918